Boğazköy or simply Boğaz is a village east of Agirda in Cyprus. It was established in the 1960s as a Turkish Cypriot village. De facto, Boğazköy is under the control of Northern Cyprus.

References

Populated places in Girne District